Pablo Olivares (29 June 1965 – 20 November 2014) was a Spanish film writer and producer. He was known for creating the TV series El ministerio del tiempo (2015). He died on 20 November 2014 from amyotrophic lateral sclerosis at age 49.

Filmography
 El ministerio del tiempo (2015-2017)
 Tiempo de confesiones (2016)
 Víctor Ros (2014)
 Isabel (2012)
 Doctor Mateo (2009-2010)
 Pelotas (2009)
 Brain Drain (2009)
 Los Serrano (2004-2007)
 Vorvik (2005)
 London Street (2003)
 Robles, investigador (2000-2001)
 El secreto de la porcelana (1999)
 Camino de Santiago (1999)
 Ni contigo ni sin tí (1998)
 Campeones (1997)
 Sabor latino (1996)

References

External links
 

1965 births
2014 deaths
Spanish male screenwriters
Spanish television producers
Film producers from Madrid
Neurological disease deaths in Spain
Deaths from motor neuron disease
21st-century Spanish screenwriters